"Tous mes copains" (All My Friends) is a song by Sylvie Vartan from her 1962 album Sylvie. It was also released on an EP and as a single that year.

Background and writing 
The song was written by Jean-Jacques Debout.

Commercial performance 
The song entered the top 10 in France (according to the charts published by the U.S. magazine Billboard in its "Hits of the World" section) and reached no. 12 in Wallonia (French Belgium).

Track listings 
7" single "M'amuser / Tous mes copains" RCA Victor 45.259 (1962)
 A. "M'amuser"
 B. "Tous mes copains"

7" EP "Moi je pense encore à toi / Dansons / M'amuser / Tous mes copains" RCA Victor 76.602 S, 86602 (1963, France etc.)
 A1. "Moi je pense encore à toi" ("Breaking Up Is Hard to Do") (2:05)
 A2. "Dansons" ("Let's Dance") (1:55)
 B1. "M'amuser" (2:33)
 B2. "Tous mes copains" (2:30)

7" single RCA Victor 45N-1338 (1963, Italy)
 A. "Tous mes copains" (2:30)
 B. "Quand le film est triste" (3:05)

Charts

Different language versions and covers 
The song was covered in Italian by Franca Alinti (under the title "Tutti i ragazzi (Tous mes copains)").

References 

 

1962 songs
1962 singles
1962 EPs
French songs
Songs about friendship
Sylvie Vartan songs
RCA Victor singles
Songs written by Jean-Jacques Debout